Lake Gusinoye (Gusinoye ozero; , Galuut nuur) is the name of a body of fresh water in the Republic of Buryatia, Russia.

Geography
The lake is located in the Gusinoozyor Basin between two ranges of the Selenga Highlands, about southwest of Ulan-Ude, the capital of the republic. It is close to the border with Mongolia. The town of Gusinoozyorsk is located on the northeastern shore of the lake. Tamchinsky datsan, one of the ancient Buddhist monasteries of Russia, is located on the opposite bank, in the village with the same name as the lake, Gusinoye Ozero.

See also
Lake Baikal

References

Gusinoye